The Isle of Man, a self-governing British Crown Dependency, in the Irish Sea, was until May 2016 divided into 24 districts for administrative purposes. These were 15 parishes, 4 towns and 5 villages, each forming the lowest unit of local government in the Isle of Man.

In May 2016, the three districts of Laxey, Lonan and Maughold merged for administrative purposes to form the parish district of Garff. In 2020. the two parish districts of Arbory and Rushen merged for administrative purposes to form the parish district of Arbory and Rushen. The total number of administrative districts thus reduced to 21, made up of:
 four towns
 two "districts" (Michael and Onchan, both of which are historically parishes)
 two "village districts" (Port Erin and Port St Mary)
 and 13 "parish districts" (including Garff, which is made up of two historical parishes: Lonan and Maughold).

Parishes and other units

References

Parishes of the Isle of Man
Government of the Isle of Man